Mustahabb is an Islamic term referring to recommended, favoured or virtuous actions.

Mustahabb actions are those whose ruling (ahkam) in Islamic law falls between mubah (neutral; neither encouraged nor discouraged) and wajib (compulsory). One definition is "duties recommended, but not essential; fulfilment of which is rewarded, though they may be neglected without punishment". Synonyms of mustahabb include masnun and mandub. The opposite of mustahabb is makruh (discouraged).

Parallels have been drawn between the concept of mustahabb in Islamic law and the concept of supererogatory acts in the Western philosophical tradition.

Examples
There are possibly thousands of mustahabb acts, including:

 As-Salamu Alaykum (a traditional Islamic greeting) (though responding to the greeting is an obligation)
 Sadaqah (charity outside of zakat)
 Umrah (except in the Shafi'i and Hanbali madhhab, wherein it is fard)

See also
 Ihtiyat Mustahabb
 Makruh
 Supererogation, a similar concept in Western philosophy and religion

References

External links
Difference between the Terms Sunnah and Mustahabb in the Terminology of Islamic Jurisprudence

Arabic words and phrases in Sharia
Islamic jurisprudence
Islamic terminology
Islamic ethics
Sharia legal terminology